Scouting and Guiding in Luxembourg is served by several different organizations:

Scouting in Luxembourg, member of the World Organization of the Scout Movement
Fédération Nationale des Eclaireurs et Eclaireuses du Luxembourg
Lëtzebuerger Guiden a Scouten, also member of the World Association of Girl Guides and Girl Scouts
Royal Rangers Luxembourg

Former associations include 
 Bureau de Liaison des Associations Guides du Luxembourg
 Association des Girl Guides Luxembourgeoises

See also